The 2014 Cupa României Final was the 76th final of Romania's most prestigious knock-out competition. The final was played at the Arena Națională stadium, in Bucharest, between Steaua București and Astra Giurgiu. Astra Giurgiu won the trophy, for the first time in their history, with a 4-2 win in a penalty shoot-out. After 120 minutes, of regular play, the score was tied at a 0-0 draw.

Route to the Final

Match details

See also 

 Supercupa României 2014

References

External links
 Official site 
 Old official site 

2014
2013–14 in Romanian football
FC Astra Giurgiu matches
FC Steaua București matches
Cupa Romaniei Final 2014